The Kara are an ethnic and linguistic group mainly based in the Ukerewe District of Mwanza Region, in the Tanzanian section of Lake Victoria (Ukara Island, Ukerewe Island, southeastern shore of the lake).  In 1987 the Kara population was estimated to number 86,000.

References

Ethnic groups in Tanzania
Indigenous peoples of East Africa